Bearbong, New South Wales is a bounded rural locality of Gilgandra Shire and a civil parish of Gowen County, a county of New South Wales.

The parish is also known as Bearbung.

The Parish is on the Wallumburrawang Creek a tributary of the Castlereagh River, and the nearest settlement of the parish is Tooraweenah, New South Wales to the north.

The parish is on the traditional lands of the Weilwan.

References

Localities in New South Wales
Geography of New South Wales
Central West (New South Wales)